Stewart Run may refer to:

Stewart Run (Octoraro Creek), a stream in Pennsylvania
Stewart Run (Indian Creek), a stream in West Virginia